Bremke is the name of the following geographical features:

Rivers
 Bremke, river near Braunlage in the county of Goslar, Lower Saxony
 Bremke, river near Scharzfeld in the county of Osterode am Harz, Lower Saxony

Places
 Bremke (Eslohe), village in the municipality of Eslohe in the Hochsauerlandkreis, North Rhine-Westphalia
 Bremke, village in the borough of Extertal in the county of Lippe, North Rhine-Westphalia
 Bremke, village in the borough of Gleichen in the county of Göttingen, Lower Saxony
 Bremke, village in the borough of Halle (Weserbergland) in the county of Holzminden, Lower Saxony
 Oettern-Bremke, village in the borough of Detmold in the county of Lippe, North Rhine-Westphalia